Don Juan is a 1922 German silent film directed by Albert Heine and Robert Land and starring Hans Adalbert Schlettow, Margarete Lanner, and Margit Barnay.

Cast
In alphabetical order

References

Bibliography

External links

1922 films
Films of the Weimar Republic
German silent feature films
Films directed by Robert Land
German black-and-white films
Films based on the Don Juan legend
1920s German films